NGC 5477 is a dwarf galaxy located in the constellation of Ursa Major, 20 million light years away from Earth. It was discovered on April 14, 1789 by the astronomer William Herschel.

References

External links
 

Dwarf galaxies
Ursa Major (constellation)
5477
09018
M101 Group
50262